Light green SF, also called C.I. 42095, light green SF yellowish,  is a green triarylmethane dye.

Uses

Biomedical
It is used in histology for staining collagen; for that purpose it is a standard dye in North America. In Masson's trichrome it is used as a counterstain to acid fuchsin. It is a component of Papanicolaou stains together with eosin Y and bismarck brown Y. In pap smears, Light Green SF confers a blue staining for the cytoplasm of active cells such as columnar cells, parabasal squamous cells, and intermediate squamous cells. It usually comes as a disodium salt. Its maximum absorption is at 630 (422) nm.

The dye is not very durable — it has a tendency to fade. When fading is to be avoided, it is replaced with fast green FCF, which also has more brilliant color. Fast green FCF can also substitute light green SF in other procedures.

Lissamine green dye can be used to check the health of the anterior surfaces of the eye. It is available on a swab, which is wet with saline and then the dye is dropped into the lower fornix. The dye shows up conjunctival staining similar to rose Bengal dye but it does not sting like rose Bengal does.

Food coloring
Light green SF was once used as a green food colorant. Its use in the U.S. was discontinued due to its low popularity.

References

Triarylmethane dyes
Staining dyes
Benzenesulfonates
Anilines